Niamuana is a village located in Faisalabad, Pakistan.

Villages in Faisalabad District